Wilkinson is an unincorporated community in DeKalb County, Illinois, United States, located  west-northwest of Sycamore.

References

Unincorporated communities in DeKalb County, Illinois
Unincorporated communities in Illinois